Spycatcher are a five-piece rock band from Watford, England, formed by ex-Cry For Silence member Steve Sears, Gallows bassist Stu Gili-Ross, and Mitch Mitchener of Haunts, plus William Taylor and Drew Elliott.

Within a fortnight of its inception, "Music That My Dad Likes" received BBC Radio 1 unsigned track of the week and featured in Kerrang!'''s 'Ten Songs You Should Hear Now'.

To date, Spycatcher have recorded and produced all their own recordings, at both Mitchener's 'Broadfields' studio, and Sears' home studio 'The Ambassador's Suite', including their debut release, "Rock Is Cursed EP", which is came out on 10 August 2009. A three track hand stamped demo was sold at early shows and was limited to a run of 100 and included early recordings of "Music That My Dad Likes", "Good Times" and "You Got Soul".

The band have been known to distribute music for free; a digital version of the rare demo was given away for two weeks after selling out of physical copies before disappearing altogether, and the title track of "Rock Is Cursed EP" is also available.

In 2011, the band released their debut album Honesty, which is available on their web store. A sampler of the record was given away with Rock Sound magazine who have supported the band early in their career. Two singles from Honesty were released; "Remember Where You Were When Michael Jackson Died" and "Don't Like People" both receiving BBC Radio 1 support and daytime airplay.

Spycatcher were confirmed as main support on the Get Up Kids tour in August 2009, with James Leach playing bass in Stu Gili-Ross' absence. In 2011, Spycatcher were also confirmed as the support for Twin Atlantic during their April/May 2011 tour, and have also supported Kids In Glass Houses, Funeral For A Friend, and Crime In Stereo amongst others. They also played the Rock Sound Riot tour in December 2011 with Every Time I Die, Trash Talk and Defeater.

2012 saw the band head touring with Make Do And Mend.

Discography
2009: "Demo" (Self Released)
2009: Rock Is Cursed EP (Self Released)
2011: Honesty'' (Atticus)

References

External links
Spycatcher Myspace page

English rock music groups